Gymnopilus hillii is a species of mushroom in the family Hymenogastraceae.

See also

List of Gymnopilus species

External links
Gymnopilus hillii at Index Fungorum

hillii
Taxa named by William Alphonso Murrill